The Joe Rogan Experience (JRE) is a podcast hosted by American comedian and presenter Joe Rogan.

JRE can also mean:
Java Runtime Environment
The Joe Rogan Experience
JR East, see East Japan Railway Company
Jeunes Restaurateurs d’Europe